Greta Lukjančukė (born 10 September 1992) is a Lithuanian footballer who plays as a goalkeeper and has appeared for the Lithuania women's national team.

Career
Lukjančukė has been capped for the Lithuania national team, appearing for the team during the 2019 FIFA Women's World Cup qualifying cycle.

References

External links
 , part 1
 , part 2
 
 

1992 births
Living people
Women's association football goalkeepers
Lithuanian women's footballers
People from Ukmergė
Lithuania women's international footballers
Gintra Universitetas players